UFC 211: Miocic vs. dos Santos 2 was a mixed martial arts event produced by the Ultimate Fighting Championship held on May 13, 2017, at the American Airlines Center in Dallas, Texas.

Background
The event was the fourth that the UFC has hosted in Dallas, following UFC 185 in March 2015, UFC 171 in March 2014, and UFC 103 in September 2009.

A UFC Heavyweight Championship bout between current champion Stipe Miocic and former champion Junior dos Santos served as the main event. The pairing met previously in December 2014 at UFC on Fox: dos Santos vs. Miocic, with dos Santos winning by a close unanimous decision.

In the co-featured slot, a UFC Women's Strawweight Championship bout between current champion Joanna Jędrzejczyk and Jéssica Andrade took place.

A heavyweight bout between former heavyweight champion Fabrício Werdum and Ben Rothwell was originally booked for UFC 203. However, Rothwell pulled out due to a knee injury. The fight was expected to take place at this event. The pairing was scrapped after Rothwell was flagged by USADA for a potential anti-doping violation.

A welterweight bout between former UFC Middleweight Championship challenger Demian Maia and Jorge Masvidal was originally targeted to headline UFC Fight Night: Swanson vs. Lobov. However, in late February, it was announced that the bout was moved to this event.

Jarjis Danho was expected to face promotional newcomer Dmitry Poberezhets at the event. However, Danho pulled out of the fight in mid-April citing an injury. He was replaced by Chase Sherman. In turn, Poberezhets was removed from the card for undisclosed reasons and was replaced by fellow newcomer Rashad Coulter.

The 2008 Olympic gold medalist in freestyle wrestling and former UFC Flyweight Championship challenger Henry Cejudo was expected to face Sergio Pettis at the event. However, on May 10, it was announced that Cejudo suffered a hand injury and the bout was canceled.

A featherweight bout between promotional newcomers, Jared Gordon and Michel Quiñones was expected for the event. However, Gordon pulled out of the fight on the day before the event due to stomach illness and as a result, Quiñones was removed from the card.

Results

Bonus awards
The following fighters were awarded $50,000 bonuses:
Fight of the Night: Chase Sherman vs. Rashad Coulter
Performance of the Night: Stipe Miocic and Jason Knight

Aftermath
On May 26, it was announced that Casey tested positive for elevated levels of testosterone in an in-competition drug screen on May 13. Per the drug-test results, her testosterone-to-epitestosterone ratio was 5.4:1, above the 4:1 limit. Casey was suspended for three months and her win over Aguilar was overturned to a no-contest by the Texas Department of Licensing and Regulation (TDLR) due to the failure. Nearly a month later, Jeff Novitzky, the UFC's VP of athlete health and performance revealed that Casey's "B" sample came back negative for banned substances and synthetic testosterone, therefore clearing her of wrongdoing both by a WADA-accredited lab and a testing laboratory hired by the TDLR. Yet Casey's case remains "still under review" by the TDLR. Novitzky urged the TDLR to reverse its decision and cautioned the promotion could steer away future UFC events from Texas if the issue isn't resolved.

On June 30, the TDLR lifted Casey's three-month suspension and gave back her victory, which was overturned to a no contest.

See also
2017 in UFC
List of UFC events

References

Ultimate Fighting Championship events
Mixed martial arts in Dallas
Sports competitions in Dallas
2017 in mixed martial arts
2017 in sports in Texas
May 2017 sports events in the United States